KADO-CD, virtual channel 40 (UHF digital channel 36), is a low-power, Class A Daystar-affiliated television station licensed to Shreveport, Louisiana, United States. The station is owned by Word of Life Ministries. KADO-CD's transmitter is located on Park Avenue west of downtown Shreveport.

While the-then KADO-LP had voluntarily applied to the Federal Communications Commission (FCC) for digital UHF channel 40, the station's management estimated the cost of digital transition to be between $150,000 and a quarter-million dollars, a prohibitive cost for a small low-power broadcaster. The station was licensed for digital operation on June 3, 2015.

References

ADO-CD
Television channels and stations established in 1997
Low-power television stations in the United States
1997 establishments in Louisiana
Daystar (TV network) affiliates